Dalsbotn Station is a railway station in Aurland, Norway, on the Flåm Line. The station opened in 1942. The 2015 - 16 Flamsbana timetable lists the station as disused.

References
Bibliography

Notes

Railway stations on the Flåm Line
Railway stations in Aurland
Railway stations opened in 1942
1942 establishments in Norway